Wu Xiang is a paralympic athlete from China competing mainly in category T11 sprint events.

He competed in both the 100m and 200m in the Paralympics in Athens and Beijing but his only medal, a gold, came as part of the Chinese T11-13 4 × 100 m relay team in the games in Athens.

References

External links
 

Paralympic athletes of China
Athletes (track and field) at the 2004 Summer Paralympics
Athletes (track and field) at the 2008 Summer Paralympics
Paralympic gold medalists for China
Chinese male sprinters
Living people
Medalists at the 2004 Summer Paralympics
Year of birth missing (living people)
Paralympic medalists in athletics (track and field)
21st-century Chinese people
Medalists at the 2010 Asian Para Games
Visually impaired sprinters
Paralympic sprinters